Love Mocktail is a 2020 Indian Kannada-language romantic drama film directed and written by Darling Krishna in his directorial debut. The film was released on 31 January 2020. The film was produced by Krishna and Milana Nagaraj, who also star in the film. The plot follows the story of Aadi on his quest to find true love.

Love Mocktail was remade in Telugu titled Gurthunda Seethakalam released in December 2022. It was one of the most successful film of 2020 and received positive reviews. A sequel titled Love Mocktail 2 released in 2022.

Plot
Adi (Darling Krishna), a software engineer, rescues Aditi (Rachana Indar). He then agrees to drop her home as he is going to her hometown Udupi. During the journey Aditi asks Adi about his romantic history. He responds by telling her about his past, from high school to the present.

The film flashes back to Adi's high school years, where he had a crush on a girl from his tuition, Reema (Vibha Kallianpur). His friend approaches her, but she rejects Adi, as her parents had a failed marriage. When he moved on to engineering college, he met Joshita, also known as Jo (Amrutha Iyengar). She is from a well-to-do family, and even though she truly loved Adi, she had doubts about his financial ability to provide her with the lifestyle she desired. Determined to quell her doubts, Adi joins an IT company after completing school. Despite this, Jo breaks up with him due to parental pressure. Heartbroken, Adi meets Nidhi (Milana Nagaraj), a fellow software employee and a down-to-earth woman. Adi and Nidhi form a happy couple, and Nidhi becomes pregnant. Unfortunately, Nidhi is unable to deliver the baby, ultimately being diagnosed with ovarian cancer. Nidhi eventually succumbs to the cancer, despite Adi's hopes that she will survive.

In the present time, Adi shows Nidhi's grave to Aditi, and the film ends with Adi driving Aditi home.

Cast
 Darling Krishna as Adithya aka Adi
Dhanush Pranav as teenage Adhi
 Milana Nagaraj as Nidhi aka Nidhima, Adi's wife
 Amrutha Iyengar as Joshitha aka Jo, Adi's love interest with whom he breaks up
 Vibha Kallianpur as teenage Reema
 Rachana Inder as Aditi
 Abhilash as Vijay
 Kushi achar as Sushma
 Geetha Bharathi as Reema 
 Ramakrishna Ganesh (Interviewer)
 Vijeth Suvarna (Interviewer)
 Hitesh Shah as Doctor

Soundtrack

The soundtrack was composed by Raghu Dixit, with lyrics by Raghavendra V Kamath and Arun Kumar.

Home media 
The film was made available for streaming over Amazon Prime on 8 March 2020.
 The film premiered on television on 29 March, on Star Suvarna.

Remake
The movie is being remade in Telugu starring Tamannaah and Satyadev Kancharana in the lead roles. The production will be led by Kannada director Nagashekar, who will also be co-producing the film with Bhavani Ravi. The film will be titled Gurthunda Seethakalam. In Odia As Gupchup.

Awards and nominations

References

External links 
 

2020 films
2020s Kannada-language films
Indian romantic drama films
Indian nonlinear narrative films
2020 romantic drama films
Films scored by Raghu Dixit
Kannada films remade in other languages
2020 directorial debut films